Syktyvkar is the capital city of the Komi Republic in Russia, as well as its largest city. It is also the capital of the Syktyvkar Urban Okrug. Until 1930, it was known as Ust-Sysolsk, after the Sysola River.

Etymology
The city's name comes from Syktyv, the Komi name for the Sysola River, plus kar, meaning "city".

Geography
Syktyvkar is located on the Sysola River, which is the origin of its former name Ust-Sysolsk. The city is located close to where the Sysola joins the larger Vychegda River, which is itself a branch of the Northern Dvina.

History

It is believed that the city was founded in 1586 as a settlement Ust-Sysola. 

It was granted city status by Catherine the Great in 1780, and in 1992, it became the capital of the Komi Republic. It has remained the capital since then, although a large influx of ethnic Russians in the 20th century has actually left the Komi a minority there.

The majority of the population were merchants and peasants. The main occupations of the inhabitants were agriculture, cattle-breeding, hunting, fishing, and trade.

By the beginning of the 20th century, the population had grown to 6,000 people. The Tsarist government made the Komi region a place of political exile.

In 1921, Ust-Sysolsk was given the status of administrative center of the newly formed Komi-Zyryan Autonomous Oblast. It was renamed as Syktyvkar, which is Komi for "a town on the Sysola" in 1930, to mark the 150th anniversary of its receipt of city privileges. In 1936, Syktyvkar became the capital of the Komi ASSR.

Administrative and municipal status
Syktyvkar is the capital of the republic. Within the framework of administrative divisions, it is, together with three urban-type settlements (Krasnozatonsky, Sedkyrkeshch, and Verkhnyaya Maksakovka) and three rural localities, incorporated as the city of republic significance of Syktyvkar—an administrative unit with the status equal to that of the districts. As a municipal division, the city of republic significance of Syktyvkar is incorporated as Syktyvkar Urban Okrug.

Economy
The Sysola, the Vychegda, and the Northern Dvina are navigable and are a major transport route of forestry products from Syktyvkar. Lumber and woodcrafts are the city's largest industries.

Previously Komiinteravia had its head office in Syktyvkar.

Transportation
The city is served by Syktyvkar Airport and Syktyvkar Southwest airfield. The city has a railway station as well. Syktyvkar is the end point of route R176 (Vyatka Highway).

Culture and education

Syktyvkar is the center of the cultural life in the republic. 

The oldest museum of the Republic of Komi, the National Museum, was founded in 1911. Nowadays, the National Museum is the Literature Memorial Museum of Ivan Kuratov and the museum of Viktor Savin.

The National Gallery was founded in Syktyvkar in 1943. It welcomes exhibitions from different museums of the country. The Theater of Opera and Ballet began its history in 1958.

The National Library numbers 2.5 million volumes, including books in the Russian language, foreign languages and in the Komi language.

Syktyvkar State University was founded in 1972 and has over 3,500 full-time students and 250 faculty members.

The city's folk ensemble "Asya Kya" has been representing Komi Republic on national and international festivals.

One of the oldest Russian progressive rock bands The Gourishankar was founded in Syktyvkar in 2001.

Sports
Stroitel which has played many seasons in the highest division of Russian bandy, nowadays called the Russian Bandy Super League, has then played several seasons in the second division, called Russian Bandy Supreme League. At the final tournament of the 2016–17 season, with two Super League tickets held in Syktyvkar, Stroitel won and was thus eligible for promotion. After discussions whether or not to accept, the answer was a yes and the team will play Super League bandy again in the season of 2017–18. Its home venue is Respublikanskiy Stadion. In the 2016/17 season, the club adopted a new logotype (shown to the right in this article) instead of an old one which had a white bear playing bandy.

There is also a youth team called KDYuSSh-1.

Events
In January 2017 the Bandy Y-19 World Championship was organized in Syktyvkar.
Syktyvkar was to host the 2021 Bandy World Championship, for which an indoor arena was to be erected. However, the tournament was repeatedly postponed due to the COVID-19 pandemic, and ultimately pulled from Syktyvkar altogether as a consequence of the 2022 Russian invasion of Ukraine.

Climate
Syktyvkar experiences a subarctic climate (Köppen climate classification Dfc) with long, cold winters and short, warm summers. Compared with areas at a similar latitude in Siberia, winters are less extreme, but still much longer than summer and bitterly cold by European standards.

Twin towns – sister cities

Syktyvkar is twinned with:

 Cullera, Spain
 Debrecen, Hungary
 Los Altos, United States
 Lovech, Bulgaria
 Taiyuan, China

References

Notes

Sources

External links
Official website of Syktyvkar 
All news of Syktyvkar and Republic of Komi 
Syktyvkar. History 
About Syktyvkar: Churches, History & Photogallery 

 
Ust-Sysolsky Uyezd